Legio XXI Rapax ("Predator, Twenty-First Legion") was a legion of the Imperial Roman army. The symbol of the legion is thought to have been a capricorn.

History

Foundation 
It was founded in 31 BC by the emperor Augustus, probably from men previously enlisted in other legions.

Augustus probably sent his new XXIst legion to Hispania Tarraconensis to fight the campaign against the Cantabrians. XXI Rapax was one of the five legions used by Drusus to suppress the rebellion of the Raetians, in 16–15 BC. From 15 BC, the legion was stationed in Castra Regina (Regensburg), in the new province of Raetia.

After Teutoburg 
After the disaster of the Battle of the Teutoburg Forest, the legion was sent as reinforcements to Germania Inferior, where they shared the base camp of Castra Vetera (Xanten) with V Alaudae. Both Legio V and Legio XXI were involved in a mutiny in AD 14. In 43, they were relocated in Vindonissa, in the province of Germania Superior.

The legion occupied Vindonissa from 46 to 69 with two auxiliary cohorts, first the III Hispanorum and VI Raetorum, and later the VII Raetorum equitata and the XXVI voluntariorum civium Romanorum.

Along with the rest of the German border army, the XXI Rapax supported its commander, Vitellius, in the Year of the Four Emperors (69) and defeated Othonian forces at the First Battle of Bedriacum. Vitellius was, however, defeated by Vespasian before the end of the year.

In 70, the legion was part of the army sent to deal with the Batavian rebellion and relieve the four legions imprisoned by Civilis. After that they were sent to Germania Superior, where they shared the castrum (camp) of Moguntiacum (modern day Mainz) with XIV Gemina.

In 89, the legions in Moguntiacum supported their commander, Lucius Antonius Saturninus, in his revolt against emperor Domitian. After the end of this unsuccessful insurrection, the legions were separated and XXI Rapax sent to Pannonia.

Destruction 
In spring of 92, several tribes (probably Marcomanni, Quadi, Jazyges) crossed the Danube and attacked Pannonia, probably destroying XXI Rapax. These tribes would be defeated from May to December 92, and chased back over the river. The Romans did not pursue the retreating tribes.

See also
List of Roman legions

Notes

External links

 Legio XXI Rapax --- re-enactment group
 livius.org account

21 Rapax
30s BC establishments
31 BC
92 disestablishments
Military units and formations established in the 1st century BC